Eugene Scott "Penny" Simmons (born 15 November 1938) is a Bermudian former sailor who competed in the 1964 Summer Olympics, in the 1968 Summer Olympics, in the 1972 Summer Olympics, and in the 1976 Summer Olympics. He finished third in the 1967 Pan American Games Snipe (with Richard Belvin), and won the International One Design World Championships six times, and the Snipe Western Hemisphere & Orient Championship in 1956.

References

1938 births
Living people
Bermudian male sailors (sport)
Olympic sailors of Bermuda
Pan American Games bronze medalists for Bermuda
Pan American Games medalists in sailing
Sailors at the 1964 Summer Olympics – Dragon
Sailors at the 1968 Summer Olympics – Dragon
Sailors at the 1972 Summer Olympics – Dragon
Sailors at the 1976 Summer Olympics – 470
Sailors at the 1967 Pan American Games
Snipe class sailors
Medalists at the 1967 Pan American Games